Winifred Tweedie Lawrence  (née Dunn; 6 January 1920 − 22 December 2006) was a New Zealand breaststroke swimmer, who, as Winnie Dunn, represented her country at the 1938 British Empire Games.

Early life and family
Born in Dunedin on 6 January 1920, Lawrence was the youngest daughter of Edward Hanratty Dunn and Ellen Clarke Dunn (née Ferguson). She was educated at King Edward Technical High School. On 30 January 1946, she married Clynton John Christie Lawrence in Dunedin.

Swimming career
Dunn first came to national attention in 1935, when she broke the New Zealand 100 metres breaststroke record, previously held by Gladys Pidgeon, with a time of 1:39.6. The record was later broken by Judith Webster of Auckland, but Dunn regained the record in December 1937 with a time of 1:33.0. She also broke the national 220 yard breaststroke record, swimming 3:22.6, and was subsequently selected to represent New Zealand in the 220 yards breaststroke at the 1938 British Empire Games in Sydney. She went on to finish seventh in that event. She was also a member of the New Zealand 3 x 110 yard medley relay team at the Sydney games, alongside Mona Leydon and Joyce Macdonald, that finished in fifth place with a time of 4:22.3.

Dunn was the New Zealand 220 yards breaststroke champion every year from 1938 to 1941, and the 100 yards breastroke champion from 1939 to 1941.

In 1939, Dunn broke the New Zealand 400 metres breaststroke record by 45.2 seconds, recording a time of 7 minutes 11 seconds. She also held the New Zealand 100 metres breaststroke record, with a time of 1:31.4, for 14 years, until it was broken by Rae Currie in 1954.

As Winifred Lawrence, she became a well-known swimming coach in Auckland over many decades, retiring in 2002.

Honours
In the 2000 Queen's Birthday Honours, Lawrence was appointed a Member of the New Zealand Order of Merit, for services to swimming. In 2001 she was made a life member of the Auckland Swimming Association.

Death
Lawrence was widowed by the death of her husband in 2001. She died on 22 December 2006, and her ashes were buried in Waikumete Cemetery.

References

1920 births
2006 deaths
Swimmers from Dunedin
New Zealand female swimmers
Female breaststroke swimmers
Commonwealth Games competitors for New Zealand
Swimmers at the 1938 British Empire Games
New Zealand swimming coaches
Members of the New Zealand Order of Merit
Burials at Waikumete Cemetery